Saint Louis River or Saint-Louis River may refer to:

Canada 
 Saint-Louis River (Yamaska River tributary), a tributary of the Yamaska River in Quebec
 Saint-Louis River (Beauharnois), a tributary of the Saint Lawrence River in Quebec
 Saint-Louis River (Du Loup River tributary) (see List of rivers of Quebec#North shore of St Lawrence river – between Repentigny and Trois-Rivières)
 Saint-Louis River (Valin River tributary), a tributary of the Valin River in Quebec
 Rivière de Grand-Saint-Louis, a tributary of the Gentilly River South-West in Quebec

United States 
 Saint Louis River (Lake Superior tributary)

Guadeloupe 
 Rivière de Saint-Louis, a river on the island of Marie-Galante